Disobedient is an upcoming Russian comedy film directed by Vladimir Kott. It is scheduled to be theatrically released on February 3, 2022.

Plot 
The film tells about a prankster named Dima, who arranges various practical jokes and he decides to shoot one of them in the church where his old friend serves, as a result of which a case is started against Dima.

Cast

References

External links 
 

2022 films
2020s Russian-language films
Russian comedy films
2022 comedy films